Święcicki (feminine: Święcicka; plural: Święciccy) is a Polish surname. In other form: Swiecicki, Swensitzky, Svientsitskyi. Notable people include:
 Józef Święcicki (1859–1913), Polish designer and builder of Bydgoszcz
 Marcin Święcicki (born 1947), Polish politician and economist
 Mikołaj Święcicki (died 1707) was from 1697, the Bishop of Kiev and Poznań
 Paulin Święcicki (1841–1876), Polish writer
 Wacław Święcicki (1848–1900), Polish poet and socialist

Polish-language surnames